Sarah Blakesley Chase (also spelled Sara Blakelee; born January 18, 1837, in Clermont County, Ohio), had been known for the continuous battle with Anthony Comstock for the selling of contraceptive devices over state borders.

Biography 
Sarah Ann Blakeslee was the daughter of a Presbyterian clergyman (James Blakeslee), who spent some time working as a missionary among people of color and Jamaican roots. She was raised in Broome County, New York and discovered at the age of twelve a passion to become a religious speaker. The purpose for her career choice had been derived from the hopes of gaining classical and medical knowledge in order to pursue a job within the medical field. Sarah wanted to aid those who suffered mentally and physically. She was characterized as a woman of courage and strength which was something that she displayed early on, by starting from bottom and guiding herself up to the top, by earning a doctor degree. Sarah had faced numerous conflicts within her life, as well as career that ultimately resulted from her gender and social class within the time period. She was a woman that wanted other woman to have a choice in their life, starting with their own body. She left the decision to prevent pregnancy up to other woman which caused this conflicting argument of whether or not her theory behind birth control was valid and if it disobeyed the churches' opinion.

Early life 
Sarah Blakeslee was raised by her father, James Blakeslee, and mother, Rachel. She had five brothers. She grew up in what many would describe as poverty, and her father had very little means to pay for her education. Women who wanted to seek employment often struggled due to men being prejudiced which decreased their chances. Luckily for Sarah she began working at the age of sixteen as a teacher’s assistant while still attending school.  She graduated from Alfred University, in Allegheny County, New York, at the age of twenty one, and decided to put herself through medical school.

Married life 
Sarah Ann Blakeslee married Hazard D. Chase in Cleveland in 1875, and was divorced from him in December 1878. Hazard was an alumnus of Michigan University. He decided to enlist in the Army, and returned to his wife four years later. Sarah Chase had a one daughter from this marriage, Grace L. On December 4, 1888, Sarah married Thomas Hookey of Denver, Colorado. "At exactly 9:15pm Mrs. Chase entered the parlor from the vestibule door on the arm of Judge Hookey, and the couple took their stand between the palms. There were no introductory remarks, but the judge immediately took Mrs. Chase's right hand and with a voice broken with emotion said: I take thee, Sarah B. Chase, as my lawful, wedded wife, proving to you in the presences of these witnesses to be a loving husband in sickness and in health until death do us part." Mrs. Chase then said her vow. Then they signed a marriage contract and their guests signed it as witnesses. This marriage lasted eight months. At her manslaughter trial in 1893, Sara stated that she did not know what had become of Mr. Hookey.

Mid life 
In 1868 Chase decided to go an alternate route. She then attended Cleveland Hospital College. Her new ambitions had been to maintain a career in teaching, but with a focus in physiology and sexology in order to teach it at local churches to men and women. Some believe that it was her new focus that led her to begin selling and exporting birth control. Chase first begun distributing contraceptives in 1873 and did so for four years until her first arrest. In May 1878, Chase was arrested by Anthony Comstock, chief agent in the New York Society for the Suppression of Vice, for violating a federal law which banned the dissemination and distribution of contraceptives through the mail or across state lines. Chase had been set up by individuals that worked with Comstock and had been arrested on the sight of the crime. Some believe that Comstock had previous knowledge of Chase’s black market birth control but lacked the evidence he needed in order to convict her.

Chase was released on a fifteen hundred dollar bail and when finally brought to trial a jury that consisted of solely men dismissed the case due to insufficient amount of evidence. After discovering that there would be no trial, Comstock had become outraged and demanded that something be done. He designed two bills of indictment that could be used against Chase but required a signature but neither the prosecutors nor judge wanted to take part. After discovering that Chase had been falsely arrested she filed a ten thousand dollar civil lawsuit against Comstock but got nowhere with it.

As far as arrest, documents indicate that between the years of 1878 and 1900 Chase had been arrested five times but did not affect her practice or mentality regarding the prevention of conception. One of the justifications for her arrest had been on the basis of a death (of Maggie Manzon on Feb 12, 1893)  that was caused by an abortion, not from the actual birth control, which resulted in Chase serving jail time (convicted of manslaughter in the first degree (June 1893) and sentenced to 9 years and 8 months in state prison). On June 4, 1990, she was arrested again by Comstock for the distributing of articles that provided details on the prevention of pregnancy. When brought before a jury, the charges were once again dropped.  Birth control to some was looked upon as a crime, while others had a different mindset about maintaining a sense of control regarding the number of babies that entered the world. Though we only know very little about Sarah B. Chase, she was one of the first woman leaders in the black market for birth control, and her success enabled others to take a stand. For instance, Margaret Sanger fought against legal impediments to reproductive rights in the 1920s. By having a change in society, Comstock decided to take the next step in seeking to have certain laws passed. One particular law, that banned distributing any type of document that promoted the prevention of conception, was a law that Comstock had lacked in previous years as a basis for arrest in regards to Sarah Chase.

Divorce 
Historians believe that because of Sarah’s will power to succeed, her marriage had suffered drastically. On December 15, 1878, her husband, Dr Hazard D Chase, decided to sue his wife, Sarah Chase, for divorce in argument of abandonment. The case was taken to court where Mr. Chase provided that indicated that his wife’s career had taken a toll on their marriage. The defense argued that because of Mrs. Chase’s determination and aspiration it led her to become a successful physician. As a result of her accomplishment, it caused tension between her and Mr. Chase due to his constant comparison to the ideal wife to Sarah.  It has created a disconnect, especially on her part which eventually led to her deciding that the best option was for her and her daughter, Grace L. Chase, to be removed from the situation. Throughout the trial, both parties spoke about the marriage and their feelings for one another but the trial went nowhere and the divorce was finalized Dec. 30, 1878. It is unclear if she divorced her second husband, Thomas Hookey, or simply ended what had been an unconventional union. After eight months of marriage she ordered Mr. Hookey to leave and gave him a payment of $5,000 cash. Mr. Hookey pressed for alimony, which Dr. Chase refused. Dr, Chase stated that Mr. Hookey had lied about being wealthy and was in fact after her wealth. However, years later she would pass herself off as Sarah T Hookey, the widow of Thomas while living with her daughter and son in law.

References

External links
 http://www.homeoint.org/history/bio/c/chasesb.htm

1837 births
American birth control activists
Date of death unknown
Year of death unknown
People from Clermont County, Ohio
Activists from Ohio